Francisco Craveiro Lopes was the 12th President of the Portuguese Republic (the second of the Estado Novo), having served one-full term from 1951 to 1958.

During his term he performed several visits to the then Portuguese overseas colonies in Africa, as well as to some foreign countries.

Below is a list of the international trips made by President Francisco Craveiro Lopes (excluding the Portuguese colonies at the time).

1953

1955

1956

1957

References

See also 
 List of international presidential trips made by Aníbal Cavaco Silva
 List of international presidential trips made by António José de Almeida
 List of international presidential trips made by Bernardino Machado
 List of international presidential trips made by Marcelo Rebelo de Sousa
 List of international presidential trips made by Mário Soares

State visits
State visits by Portuguese presidents
20th century in international relations
Craveiro Lopes
Personal timelines